Richard Eimer Lenski (born August 13, 1956) is an American evolutionary biologist,  a Hannah Distinguished Professor of Microbial Ecology at Michigan State University. He is a member of the National Academy of Sciences and a MacArthur  fellow.  Lenski is best known for his still ongoing -year-old long-term E. coli evolution experiment, which has been instrumental in understanding the core processes of evolution, including mutation rates, clonal interference, antibiotic resistance, the evolution of novel traits, and speciation.  He is also well known for his pioneering work in studying evolution digitally using self-replicating organisms called Avida.

Early life
Richard E. Lenski is the son of sociologist Gerhard Lenski and poet Jean Lenski ( Cappelmann). He is also the great-nephew of children's author Lois Lenski and the great-grandson of Lutheran commentator Richard C. H. Lenski.  He earned his BA from Oberlin College in 1976, and his PhD from the University of North Carolina in 1982.

Career
Lenski won a Guggenheim Fellowship in 1991 and a MacArthur Fellowship in 1996, and in 2006 he was elected to the United States National Academy of Sciences.

Lenski is a fellow at the American Academy of Microbiology and the American Academy of Arts and Sciences and holds the office Hannah Distinguished Professor of microbial ecology at Michigan State University.

On February 17, 2010, he co-founded the NSF Science and Technology Center for the Study of Evolution in Action, known as the BEACON Center.

He was elected to the American Philosophical Society in 2018.

Lenski was the recipient of the 2021 Lifetime Achievement Award from the Society for the Study of Evolution.

E. coli experiment

The E. coli long-term evolution experiment is an ongoing study in experimental evolution led by Richard Lenski that has been tracking genetic changes in 12 initially identical populations of asexual Escherichia coli bacteria since 24 February 1988. The populations reached the milestone of 50,000 generations .

Since the experiment's inception, Lenski and his colleagues have reported a wide array of genetic changes; some evolutionary adaptations have occurred in all 12 populations, while others have only appeared in one or a few populations. One particularly striking adaptation was the evolution of a strain of E. coli that was able to use citrate as a carbon source in an aerobic environment.

Avida simulation
Richard Lenski, Charles Ofria, et al. at Michigan State University developed an artificial life computer program with the ability to detail the evolution of complex systems. The system uses values set to determine random mutations and allows for the effect of natural selection to conserve beneficial traits. The program was dubbed Avida and starts with an artificial petri dish where organisms reproduce and perform mathematical calculations to acquire rewards of more computer time for replication. The program randomly adds mutations to copies of the artificial organisms to allow for natural selection. As the artificial life reproduced, different lines adapted and evolved depending on their set environments. The beneficial side to the program is that it parallels that of real life at rapid speeds.

Media
In August 2013, having been inspired by a presentation by Titus Brown on the role of social media in science, Lenski began blogging at Telliamed Revisited and tweeting as @RELenski.

Lenski's research has received considerable attention, including lengthy discussion in Carl Zimmer's book on E. coli, Microcosm, and in Richard Dawkins' book on the evidence for evolution, The Greatest Show on Earth. Included in Dawkins' discussion was a description of the dialog Lenski had in 2008 with Andrew Schlafly, creator of Conservapedia, which Schlafly initiated as a reaction to reports of Lenski's description of the evolution of aerobic citrate usage in one of the long-term evolution experiment populations. These same findings were later cited by the creationist Ken Ham in a debate over evolution with Bill Nye. Lenski strongly criticized Ham's citation of his work and the conclusions Ham drew from it.

References

External links
 E. coli Long-term Experimental evolution site
 BEACON Center for the Study of Evolution in Action
 News release from Michigan State University
 The Loom : A New Step In Evolution

1956 births
Evolutionary biologists
Living people
MacArthur Fellows
Members of the United States National Academy of Sciences
Michigan State University faculty
Oberlin College alumni
University of North Carolina at Chapel Hill alumni
Phage workers
21st-century American biologists
Santa Fe Institute people
Fellows of the Ecological Society of America
Members of the American Philosophical Society
Researchers of artificial life